Faire may refer to:

 Laissez-faire, a French phrase meaning "let do, let go, let pass"
 Laissez Faire Books, libertarian bookseller
 Maker Faire, event created by Make magazine
 Heloise and the Savoir Faire, pop music group
 How Weird Street Faire, street fair and electronic music festival in San Francisco
 Savoir-Faire, a piece of interactive fiction written by Emily Short
 Scènes à faire, a principle in copyright law
 Science Faire, a compilation album by pop group The Apples in Stereo
 Vintage Faire Mall, a shopping mall in Modesto, California
 Virginia Brown Faire (1904–1980), American silent-film actress
 West Coast Computer Faire (1977–1989), computer industry conference

See also
Fair (disambiguation)
Fare (disambiguation)
Renaissance fair (disambiguation)
List of Renaissance fairs